José Corrales (October 20, 1937 – May 2002) was a Cuban poet and playwright.

Biography
José Corrales was born in Guanabacoa on October 20, 1937. He performed with Francisco Morin's Prometeo theater group in Havana and wrote for Bohemia and La Gaceta de Cuba.

He left Cuba in 1964 for Mexico and settled in New York the following year. Corrales soon became active with the local Hispanic theater community, serving as literary advisor for Dumé Spanish Theatre and also working with INTAR Theatre, Centro Cultural Cubano, and the Latin American Theater Ensemble. He also directed the Spanish Drama Club at Mercy College.

Corrales authored about twenty-five plays, among them Las hetairas habaneras with Manuel Pereiras García, Un vals de Chopin, and Los tres Marios y Cuestión de santidad. His poetry appeared in various magazines and anthologies in the United States and Spain. A large part of his works remain unpublished. José Corrales died in May 2002 in New York.

Works or publications

Notes and references

External links

 The José Corrales papers are available at the Cuban Heritage Collection, University of Miami Libraries. This collection consists of the works of Cuban poet, playwright, and critic José Corrales (1937-2002), including published and unpublished scripts, poems, essays, stories, criticism, editorials, and articles. It also includes programs for performances of his plays and personal papers such as personal and business correspondence, financial records, and research notes.
 Creator page for José Corrales in the Cuban Theater Digital Archive.

1937 births
2002 deaths
Cuban dramatists and playwrights
American male dramatists and playwrights
Hispanic and Latino American dramatists and playwrights
20th-century Cuban poets
Cuban male poets
Cuban emigrants to the United States
Exiles of the Cuban Revolution in Mexico
20th-century American poets
20th-century American dramatists and playwrights
Exiles of the Cuban Revolution in the United States
20th-century American male writers